Louis John Magill (January 31, 1871 – February 20, 1921) was an American officer born in Erie, Pennsylvania, and serving in the United States Marine Corps during the Spanish–American War who was one of 23 Marine Corps officers approved to receive the Marine Corps Brevet Medal for bravery, but died before it could be presented.

Secretary of the Navy citation
Citation
The Secretary of the Navy takes pleasure in transmitting to Second Lieutenant Louis John Magill, United States Marine Corps, the Brevet Medal which is awarded in accordance with Marine Corps Order No. 26 (1921), for good judgment and gallantry in battle while serving with the First Marine (Huntington's) Battalion, at Guantanamo, Cuba, on 13 June 1898. On 10 August 1898, Second Lieutenant Magill is appointed First Lieutenant and Captain, by brevet, to take rank from 13 June 1898.

See also

References
General

Specific

1871 births
1921 deaths
United States Marine Corps colonels
American people of the Spanish–American War
People from Erie, Pennsylvania
United States Naval Academy alumni
Military personnel from Pennsylvania